Priyadarshan is an Indian film director, producer, and screenwriter. Priyadarsan movies are mostly known for their comedy but he did an artistically historical epic film about freedom fighters in India known as Kaalapani and his epic period drama is Kancheevaram. In a career spanning almost three decades, Priyadarshan has directed over 90 films in several Indian languages, predominantly Malayalam and Hindi, besides six in Tamil, and two in Telugu. Though he began his career in Malayalam cinema in 1984, Priyadarshan was active mainly in Hindi cinema for 2001–2010. In 2013, he announced Rangrezz would be his last Hindi film for a while; and he is shifting focus to Malayalam Cinema.

Priyadrshan has also tried his hand at action and thriller films from time to time. His collaborations with Mohanlal were highly popular and noted in Malayalam cinema during the 1980s and 1990s, with films such as Poochakkoru Mookkuthi, Mazha Peyyunnu Maddalam Kottunnu, Thalavattam, Vellanakalude Nadu, Chithram, Vandanam, Kilukkam, Abhimanyu, Mithunam, Thenmavin Kombath, and Kala Pani. Actors he has worked with over several films include Kuthiravattam Pappu, Jagathy Sreekumar, Nedumudi Venu, Sreenivasan, Sukumari, Mukesh and Mammukoya, Prakash Raj. He was also credited as the story writer of the 1986 film Ninnishtam Ennishtam.

Priyadarshan was one of the first directors in India to introduce rich color grading, clear sound and quality dubbing through his Malayalam films. Upon entering Bollywood, he has mostly adapted stories from popular comedy films from Malayalam cinema, some from his own work and some from others works. These include Hera Pheri, Hungama, Hulchul, Garam Masala, Bhagam Bhag, Chup Chup Ke, Dhol, and Bhool Bhulaiyaa. Actors he has worked with multiple times in Hindi cinema include Akshay Kumar, Suniel Shetty, Akshaye Khanna, Paresh Rawal, Tabu, and Rajpal Yadav.

Films

1971-1980

1981-1990

1991-2000

2001-2010

2011-2020

2021 – present

Web series

References

External links
 Official Website
 
 

Indian filmographies
Director filmographies